Yury Viktorovich Postrigay (born 31 August 1988) is a Russian canoeist, who won Men's K-2 200 metres Gold Medal in the 2012 Summer Olympics with Alexander Dyachenko.

References

External links

1988 births
Russian male canoeists
Living people
Canoeists at the 2012 Summer Olympics
Olympic canoeists of Russia
Olympic gold medalists for Russia
Olympic medalists in canoeing
ICF Canoe Sprint World Championships medalists in kayak
Medalists at the 2012 Summer Olympics
European Games competitors for Russia
Canoeists at the 2015 European Games
People from Sverdlovsk
Universiade medalists in canoeing
Universiade gold medalists for Russia
Medalists at the 2013 Summer Universiade